Alpenus is a genus of tiger moths in the family Erebidae. The moths are found in the Afrotropics.

Species
 Alpenus affiniola (Strand, 1919)
 Alpenus auriculatus Watson, 1989
 Alpenus diversatus (Hampson, 1916)
 Alpenus dollmani (Hampson, 1920)
 Alpenus geminipuncta (Hampson, 1916)
 Alpenus intactus (Hampson, 1916)
 Alpenus investigatorum (Karsch, 1898)
 Alpenus maculosus (Stoll in Cramer, 1781)
 Alpenus microstictus (Hampson, 1920)
 Alpenus nigropunctatus (Bethune-Baker, 1908)
 Alpenus pardalina (Rothschild, 1910)
 Alpenus schraderi (Rothschild, 1910)
 Alpenus schraderi rattrayi (Rothschild, 1910)
 Alpenus thomasi Watson, 1989
 Alpenus whalleyi Watson, 1989
 Alpenus wichgrafi Watson, 1989

References
, 1988 [1989]: A review of Spilosoma-like Afrotropical tiger-moths (Lepidoptera: Arctiidae). Entomologica Scandinavica 19: 251-291.

Spilosomina
Moth genera